Mantua Township (pronounced man-CHEW-uh) is a township in Gloucester County in the U.S. state of New Jersey. As of the 2020 United States census, the township's population was 15,235, an increase of 18 (+0.1%) from the 2010 census count of 15,217, which in turn reflected an increase of 1,000 (+7.0%) from the 14,217 counted in the 2000 census.

Mantua Township was formed as a township by an act of the New Jersey Legislature on February 23, 1853 from portions of Greenwich Township. Portions of the township were taken to form East Greenwich Township (February 10, 1881) and Pitman (May 24, 1905). The township is named after Mantua, Italy or for a Mantua sub-tribe of the Lenape Native Americans.

Geography
According to the U.S. Census Bureau, the township had a total area of 16.09 square miles (41.67 km2), including 16.01 square miles (41.45 km2) of land and 0.09 square miles (0.22 km2) of water (0.53%).

Richwood is an unincorporated community and census-designated place (CDP) located within portions of both Harrison Township and Mantua Township. The CDP had a 2010 population of 3,459, of which 3,400 were in Harrison Township and 59 in Mantua Township. Other unincorporated communities, localities, and places located partially or completely within the township include Barnsboro, Boodys Mills, Carpenter's Landing, Centre City, Eastlack Corner, Jessups, Manunkachunk, Sewell, and West Landing.

The township borders Deptford Township, East Greenwich Township, Glassboro, Harrison Township, Pitman, Washington Township, Wenonah, and West Deptford Township.

Demographics

2010 census

The Census Bureau's 2006–2010 American Community Survey showed that (in 2010 inflation-adjusted dollars) median household income was $80,743 (with a margin of error of +/− $4,473) and the median family income was $88,586 (+/− $5,058). Males had a median income of $66,993 (+/− $4,279) versus $49,500 (+/− $7,015) for females. The per capita income for the borough was $35,073 (+/− $2,942). About 2.7% of families and 4.5% of the population were below the poverty line, including 8.1% of those under age 18 and 3.6% of those age 65 or over.

2000 census
As of the 2000 census, there were 14,217 people, 5,265 households, and 3,948 families residing in the township. The racial makeup of the township was 95.81% White, 2.07% African American, 0.20% Native American, 0.86% Asian, 0.28% from other races, and 0.78% from two or more races. Hispanic or Latino of any race were 1.26% of the population.

There were 5,265 households, out of which 36.9% had children under the age of 18 living with them, 62.1% were married couples living together, 9.0% had a female householder with no husband present, and 25.0% were non-families. 21.1% of all households were made up of individuals, and 7.3% had someone living alone who was 65 years of age or older.  The average household size was 2.69 and the average family size was 3.14.

In the township, the population was spread out, with 26.7% under the age of 18, 6.3% from 18 to 24, 33.6% from 25 to 44, 22.3% from 45 to 64, and 11.1% who were 65 years of age or older.  The median age was 36 years. For every 100 females, there were 96.0 males.  For every 100 females age 18 and over, there were 92.5 males.

The median income for a household in the township was $58,256, and the median income for a family was $63,391. Males had a median income of $46,984 versus $32,495 for females. The per capita income for the township was $24,147.  About 2.8% of families and 3.6% of the population were below the poverty line, including 4.3% of those under age 18 and 2.1% of those age 65 or over.

Arts and culture
Musical groups from the township include pop punk band Major League.

Parks and recreation
Tall Pines State Preserve is a  nature preserve that opened in November 2015 as Gloucester County's first state park and is located along the border of Deptford Township and Mantua Township. Originally a forest that was turned into an asparagus field and then a golf course, the land was preserved through efforts of South Jersey Land and Water Trust, the Friends of Tall Pines, Gloucester County Nature Club, and the New Jersey Green Acres Program.

Government

Local government 
Mantua Township is governed under the Township form of New Jersey municipal government, one of 141 municipalities (of the 564) statewide that use this form, the second-most commonly used form of government in the state. The Township Committee is comprised of five members, who are elected directly by the voters at-large in partisan elections to serve three-year terms of office on a staggered basis, with either one or two seats coming up for election each year as part of the November general election in a three-year cycle. At an annual reorganization meeting, the Township Committee selects one of its members to serve as Mayor and another as Deputy Mayor.

, members of the Mantua Township Committee are Mayor Pete Scirrotto (D, term on committee and as mayor ends December 31, 2022), Deputy Mayor Robert T. Zimmerman (D, term on committee ends 2024; term as deputy mayor ends 2022), Shawn K. Layton (D, 2024), John Legge (D, 2023), and Eileen Lukens (D, 2022).

Federal, state, and county representation 
Mantua Township is located in the 1st Congressional District and is part of New Jersey's 5th state legislative district. 

Prior to the 2011 reapportionment following the 2010 census, Mantua Township had been in the 3rd state legislative district.

Politics
As of March 2011, there were a total of 10,232 registered voters in Mantua Township, of which 3,493 (34.1%) were registered as Democrats, 2,020 (19.7%) were registered as Republicans and 4,712 (46.1%) were registered as Unaffiliated. There were 7 voters registered as Libertarians or Greens.

In the 2012 presidential election, Democrat Barack Obama received 50.3% of the vote (3,855 cast), ahead of Republican Mitt Romney with 48.2% (3,692 votes), and other candidates with 1.5% (117 votes), among the 7,731 ballots cast by the township's 10,720 registered voters (67 ballots were spoiled), for a turnout of 72.1%. In the 2008 presidential election, Democrat Barack Obama received 50.0% of the vote (3,902 cast), ahead of Republican John McCain with 47.3% (3,687 votes) and other candidates with 1.6% (126 votes), among the 7,800 ballots cast by the township's 10,429 registered voters, for a turnout of 74.8%. In the 2004 presidential election, Republican George W. Bush received 50.0% of the vote (3,704 ballots cast), outpolling Democrat John Kerry with 48.7% (3,604 votes) and other candidates with 0.7% (70 votes), among the 7,408 ballots cast by the township's 9,657 registered voters, for a turnout percentage of 76.7.

In the 2013 gubernatorial election, Republican Chris Christie received 66.0% of the vote (2,985 cast), ahead of Democrat Barbara Buono with 31.9% (1,445 votes), and other candidates with 2.1% (94 votes), among the 4,620 ballots cast by the township's 10,604 registered voters (96 ballots were spoiled), for a turnout of 43.6%. In the 2009 gubernatorial election, Republican Chris Christie received 48.1% of the vote (2,422 ballots cast), ahead of  Democrat Jon Corzine with 40.8% (2,055 votes), Independent Chris Daggett with 8.6% (435 votes) and other candidates with 0.8% (40 votes), among the 5,031 ballots cast by the township's 10,357 registered voters, yielding a 48.6% turnout.

Education 
Children in pre-kindergarten through sixth grade for public school are served by the Mantua Township School District. As of the 2020–21 school year, the district, comprised of three schools, had an enrollment of 1,200 students and 121.4 classroom teachers (on an FTE basis), for a student–teacher ratio of 9.9:1. Schools in the district (with 2020–21 enrollment data from the National Center for Education Statistics) are 
Sewell School with 282 students in pre-kindergarten through Kindergarten, 
Centre City School with 441 students in grades 1–3 and 
J. Mason Tomlin School with 477 students in grades 4–6.

Public school students in seventh through twelfth grades attend the schools of the Clearview Regional High School District, which serves students from Harrison Township and Mantua Township. Schools in the district (with 2020–2021 enrollment data from the National Center for Education Statistics) are 
Clearview Regional Middle School with 788 students (grades 7 and 8) and Clearview Regional High School with 1,485 students (grades 9–12). Seats on the high school district's nine-member board are allocated based on population, with five seats assigned to Mantua Township.

Students from across the county are eligible to apply to attend Gloucester County Institute of Technology, a four-year high school in Deptford Township that provides technical and vocational education. As a public school, students do not pay tuition to attend the school.

Guardian Angels Regional School is a K-8 school that operates under the auspices of the Roman Catholic Diocese of Camden. Its PreK-3 campus is in Gibbstown while its 4-8 campus is in Paulsboro.

Transportation

Roads and highways

Route 45 and Route 55 are the main highways serving Mantua Township. County Route 553 and County Route 553 Alternate also traverse the township.

Public transportation
NJ Transit bus service is available in the township between Bridgeton and Philadelphia on the 410 route and between Sewell and Philadelphia on the 412 route.

Notable people

People who were born in, residents of, or otherwise closely associated with Mantua Township include:
 Thomas Carpenter (1752–1847), early American glassmaker
 Mario Cerrito (born 1984), filmmaker, writer and producer known in the horror/thriller genre
 Ryan D'Imperio (born 1987), retired NFL fullback who played for the Minnesota Vikings
George W. F. Gaunt (1865–1918), President of the New Jersey State Senate
 Tara Lipinski (born 1982), figure skater who won the Olympic gold medal in figure skating at the 1998 Winter Olympics at the age of 15
 Franke Sisto, Winner of Endurance 4
 John E. Wallace Jr. (born 1942), Associate Justice of the New Jersey Supreme Court

References

External links

Mantua Township official website

 
1853 establishments in New Jersey
Populated places established in 1853
Township form of New Jersey government
Townships in Gloucester County, New Jersey